David Belliard (born 29 May 1978) is a French politician. From 2014 to 2020, he was the leader of the Green Party faction at the Council of Paris. He ran for mayor of Paris in the 2020 municipal election as the Ecologist candidate. As of July 2020, he serves as a member of the executive team to the Mayor of Paris, Anne Hidalgo, in charge of the transformation of public spaces, as well as transportation, mobility, rules and regulations on city streets, and the management of roads.

Early life 
Belliard was born on 29 May 1978 in La Teste-de-Buch and was raised in Augicourt, near Vesoul, in rural France, in a working-class family. His father was a bricklayer and his mother a cleaning woman. To this day, Belliard refers to himself as a "son of proletarians". He wrote a book about his mother, her illness, and his devastation after she died in 2020.

After studying in Nancy, he attended EdHEC, a business School in Lille, borrowing money and working to finance his studies.

After a first experience as a consultant, which he describes as "inconclusive", he moved to Paris in 2000 to work as a journalist for Alternatives économiques, a post he has continued part-time since being elected to the City Council during the 2014 municipal election.

Activism 
David Belliard, who is openly gay, became Deputy Chief Executive of Sidaction in 2008.

Politics 
David Belliard joined the Green Party in 2002 and has been an active member since. He played a role in the 2009 campaign for the European Parliament and in the transformation of the "Greens" to "Europe Ecology-The Greens". He was elected to the Council of Paris as a Councillor for the 11th arrondissement of Paris in the 2014 election. He has served as a metropolitan advisor for the Metropole du Grand Paris since its creation in December 2015.

In March 2019, Belliard put forward his candidacy for mayor as the Green Party candidate in the 2020 municipal elections. He won the nomination on 1 June 2019 with 49.61% of the party vote, placing ahead of the other candidate, Julien Bayou.

On 11 February 2020, Belliard said that while he condemned violence against individuals and property, it was important to understand the root causes behind the invasion of BlackRock's headquarters by ecological activists in Paris.

After the first round of the Paris municipal election, Belliard and Europe Ecology-The Greens negotiated a common political program and hybrid electoral list with Paris En Commun, resulting in an alliance for the second round of the election. At the city level, this coalition won the election with 48.70% of all votes.

As of 3 July 2020, Belliard serves as a member of the executive team to the Mayor of Paris, Anne Hidalgo, responsible for the transformation of public spaces, as well as transportation, mobility, rules and regulations on city streets, and the management of roads.

Books 

 Nous ne sommes pas coupables d’être malades, avec Alix Béranger, éditions Petits matins, 2010
 Notre santé est-elle à vendre ?, éditions Textuel, 2012
Paris, rêve de gosse, 2020
Et soudain tout s’éteint, Stock

Notes 

1978 births
Living people
Councillors of Paris
French political candidates
Europe Ecology – The Greens politicians
French male journalists
Gay politicians
Gay journalists
French LGBT politicians
French LGBT journalists
21st-century French LGBT people
People from Gironde